Cyclophora binocellaria is a moth in the  family Geometridae. It is found in Venezuela and Bolivia.

References

Moths described in 1855
binocellaria
Moths of South America